Doris Allen was an American soul singer. She and Genie Pace were signed to the independent label Jade Records, started by former Bethlehem Records executive Jim Bright, in 1957. Billboard magazine referred to them as "thrushes". Allen went on to receive some acclaim as a singer of soul music with partner Big John Hamilton in the 1960s. Her songs include "A Shell of a Woman", "Kiss Yourself For Me", "Let a Little Love In", "Hanging Heavy In My Mind", "A Place in My Heart", "Them Changes", "Bright Star", "Candy from a Baby", "Treat Me Like a Woman", "Full Time Fool", and "Night Time Is the Right Time". Allen was also recorded on Emerald Coast Records (run by Finley Duncan) out of Panama City, Florida.

References

American soul singers